S2 was a television station broadcast throughout the Scottish and Grampian ITV regions by SMG plc, the holder of the Scottish and Grampian region ITV franchises. S2, which aired on the digital terrestrial platform (branded ONdigital, at the time), was launched 30 April 1999 and closed just over two years later — as part of a deal with ITV Digital — on 27 July 2001. The channel was also broadcast on cable television services NTL and Telewest.

At launch, S2 was on air between 4pm and 2am, seven days a week, with its target audience being 16- to 34-year-olds. S2 Live, an entertainment show was S2's flagship show, and aired every night, presented by Sarah Heaney. The channel also repeated drama and documentary programmes, originally shown on Scottish/Grampian. S2 also broadcast sports coverage, including Scottish rugby.

By the end of its life, it had lost nearly all of its Scottish programmes and mainly simulcast ITV2, but covered the ITV2 graphic with an opaque S2 graphic. This caused controversy and forced the broadcaster further into removing the channel.

Although S2 initially had great ambitions for the station, it closed in 2001 as part of a deal with ITV Digital. The channel capacity was first replaced by the now defunct ITV Sport Channel and then ITV2.

The Grampian and Scottish franchises have operated together as STV since 2006.

See also
ITV2
STV
STV2
Sky Scottish
UTV2

References

External links
Official Website - at launch (archived)
Official Website - at closure (archived)

1999 establishments in Scotland
Defunct television channels in Scotland
Mass media in Glasgow
Scottish brands
STV Group
Television channels and stations established in 1999
Television channels and stations disestablished in 2001